Eswatini Cricket Association is the official governing body of the sport of cricket in Eswatini (formerly known as Swaziland). Eswatini Cricket Association is Eswatini's representative at the International Cricket Council and is an associate member and has been a member of that body since 2007. It is also a member of the African Cricket Association.

References

External links
Cricinfo-Eswatini

Cricket administration
Cricket in Eswatini
Eswatini in international cricket
Sports governing bodies in Eswatini